Gianluca Vivan (born 27 December 1983) is an Italian footballer. He plays as a goalkeeper for La Fiorita.

References

External links
 
 AIC profile 

1983 births
Living people
Italian footballers
S.S. Juve Stabia players
Calcio Lecco 1912 players
U.S. Viterbese 1908 players
Rovigo Calcio players
A.S.D. Olimpia Colligiana players
Footballers from Rome
Association football goalkeepers
Campionato Sammarinese di Calcio players